La Más Perfecta Colección is the third greatest hits compilation by Spanish recording artist Mónica Naranjo released on 6 December 2011 through Sony. The album includes most of her hits from her five studio albums and "Enamorada de Ti", which was included on her compilation Colección Privada (2005), and also includes one new track, "Emperatriz de Mis Sueños", which was used as the theme song for the Mexican telenovela Emperatriz. The album also includes a bonus DVD with music videos and live performances from her hits.

Track listing

References

Mónica Naranjo compilation albums
2011 compilation albums
Sony Music compilation albums
Spanish-language compilation albums